The Best FIFA Football Awards 2017 were held on 23 October 2017 in London, United Kingdom. The ceremony was held at the London Palladium and was hosted by Idris Elba and Layla Anna-Lee. Cristiano Ronaldo, Lieke Martens, Gianluigi Buffon, Zinedine Zidane and Sarina Wiegman were among the award-winners.

Winners and nominees

The Best FIFA Men's Player

A panel of experts on men's football representing various FIFA and external football stakeholders compiled a shortlist of 24 male players for The Best FIFA Men's Player. The 24 candidates were announced on 17 August. The three finalists were announced on 22 September 2017.

Cristiano Ronaldo won the award with over 43% of the vote.	

The selection criteria for the men's players of the year were: sporting performance, as well as general conduct on and off the pitch from 20 November 2016 to 2 July 2017.

The Best FIFA Goalkeeper

A panel of experts on football representing various FIFA and external football stakeholders compiled a shortlist of three goalkeepers for The Best FIFA Goalkeeper.

Gianluigi Buffon won the award with over 42% of the vote.

The selection criteria for the men's football coaches of the year were: the best goalkeeper, regardless of championship or nationality, for his achievements during the period from 20 November 2016 to 2 July 2017 inclusive.

The Best FIFA Men's Coach

A panel of experts on men's football representing various FIFA and external football stakeholders compiled a shortlist of twelve men's football coaches for The Best FIFA Men's Coach. The twelve candidates were announced on 17 August. The three finalists were announced on 22 September 2017.

Zinedine Zidane won the award with over 46% of the vote.

The selection criteria for the men's football coaches of the year were: performance and general behaviour of their teams on and off the pitch from 20 November 2016 to 2 July 2017.

The Best FIFA Women's Player

A panel of experts on women's football representing each of the six confederations selected a shortlist of ten female players for The Best FIFA Women's Player. The 10 candidates were announced on 17 August. The three finalists were announced on 22 September 2017.

Lieke Martens won the award with nearly 22% of the vote.

The selection criteria for the women's players of the year were: sporting performance, as well as general conduct on and off the pitch from 20 November 2016 to 6 August 2017.

The Best FIFA Women's Coach

A panel of experts on women's football representing each of the six confederations selected a shortlist of ten women's football coaches for The Best FIFA Women's Coach. The 10 candidates were announced on 17 August. The three finalists were announced on 22 September 2017.

Sarina Wiegman won the award with over 36% of the vote.

The selection criteria for the women's football coaches of the year were: performance and general behaviour of their teams on and off the pitch from 20 November 2016 to 6 August 2017.

FIFA Fair Play Award

The award is bestowed on a player, a coach, a team, a match official, an individual fan or a fan group in recognition of exemplary fair play either on the pitch or in relation to an official football match during November 2016 to August 2017. The award was given to the most outstanding ”fair-play” gesture/behaviour of the year (an act of fair play either on the pitch or in relation to an official football match — which could also include any amateur league).

FIFA Puskás Award

The shortlist was announced on 22 September 2017. The three finalists were announced on 9 October 2017.

Olivier Giroud won the award with over 36% of the vote.

FIFA Fan Award

The award celebrates the best fan moment of November 2016 to August 2017, regardless of championship, gender or nationality.

The three nominees were announced on 22 September 2017.

Celtic supporters won the award with nearly 56% of the vote.

FIFA FIFPro World11

The 55–player men's shortlist was announced on 20 September 2017.

The players chosen included Gianluigi Buffon as goalkeeper, Dani Alves, Leonardo Bonucci, Sergio Ramos, and Marcelo as defenders, Luka Modrić, Toni Kroos, and Andrés Iniesta as midfielders, and Lionel Messi, Cristiano Ronaldo, and Neymar as forwards.

 Second Team

 Third Team

 Fourth Team

 Fifth Team

References

External links
 Official website

2017
2017 in association football
2017 sports awards
October 2017 sports events in the United Kingdom
2017 in English sport
Football in London
2017 sports events in London
Women's association football trophies and awards
2017 in women's association football